Leathernecking is a 1930 American musical comedy film directed by Edward F. Cline, from a screenplay by Alfred Jackson and Jane Murfin, adapted from the Broadway musical comedy Present Arms, by Richard Rodgers, Lorenz Hart and Herbert Fields.

Although based on a musical, it used only two of the original Rodgers and Hart songs from the Broadway hit, along with original songs, including three by Oscar Levant and Sidney Clare. An early part-color feature film with a Technicolor insert, this film was Irene Dunne's film debut.

Plot
Chick Evans is a Marine private in Honolulu, Hawaii.  He falls for society girl Delphine Witherspoon, and begins to scheme as to how to win her over.  His first plan involves impersonating an officer in order to get invited to a society party. However, when his Marine buddies decide to crash the party as well, his real rank is revealed, and so having the opposite effect on Delphine as he had planned.

Despondent, he bares his soul to a mutual friend, Edna, who arranges to have the two reunited on Delphine's yacht at sea.  However, this meeting goes terribly wrong as well, and a desperate Chick convinces the yacht's captain to fake a shipwreck in order to give him time to win Delphine over.  Unfortunately, a real storm arises and the ship is actually wrecked, coming to rest on a desert island. While on the island, Chick's persistence pays off, and he gets the girl. Not only that, on their return to Honolulu, he is hailed as a hero and promoted to captain.

Cast
 Irene Dunne as Delphine Witherspoon
 Ken Murray as Frank
 Louise Fazenda as Hortense
 Ned Sparks as Reynolds (Sparks)
 Lilyan Tashman as Edna
 Eddie Foy Jr. as Chick Evans
 Benny Rubin as Stein
 Rita La Roy as Fortune Teller
 Fred Santley as Douglas
 William von Brinken as Richter
 Carl Gerard as Colonel
 Werther Weidler as Richter's son
 Wolfgang Weidler as Richter's son

(Cast list as per AFI database)

Songs (partial list)
"You Took Advantage of Me"
"A Kiss For Cinderella"
"All My Life"
"Careless Kisses"
"Evening Star"
"Mighty Nice and So Particular"
"Shake It Off and Smile"

"You Took Advantage Of Me" and "A Kiss For Cinderella", the first two songs, were written by Rodgers and Hart. The other songs were written by Oscar Levant and Sidney Clare, except for "All My Life", which had words and music by Benny Davis and Harry Akst.

Notes
The musical comedy on which this film was based, Present Arms, ran from April through September 1928 at Lew Fields' Mansfield Theatre (currently the Brooks Atkinson Theatre).  Produced by Lew Fields, it had music by Richard Rodgers, lyrics by Lorenz Hart, with a book by Herbert Fields. It starred and was choreographed by Busby Berkeley.

The John Tiller Sunshine Girls also appeared in this film.

In 1958, the film entered the public domain in the United States because the claimants did not renew its copyright registration in the 28th year after publication.

See also
 List of early color feature films

References

External links
 

1930 films
1930s color films
Films directed by Edward F. Cline
RKO Pictures films
Films about the United States Marine Corps
Films based on musicals
Films set in Honolulu
Films with screenplays by Jane Murfin
1930 musical comedy films
American musical comedy films
1930s English-language films
1930s American films